Euthria amorimi is a species of sea snail, a marine gastropod mollusk in the family Buccinidae, the true whelks.

Description
The length of the shell attains 40 mm.

Distribution
This marine species occurs off the Cape Verdes.

References

 Rolán E., 2005. Malacological Fauna From The Cape Verde Archipelago. Part 1, Polyplacophora and Gastropoda
 Fraussen K. & Swinnen F. (2016). A review of the genus Euthria Gray, 1839 (Gastropoda: Buccinidae) from the Cape Verde archipelago. Xenophora Taxonomy. 11: 9-31

External links

Buccinidae
Gastropods described in 2004